Exemplars of Evil is a supplement to the 3.5 edition of the Dungeons & Dragons role-playing game written by Robert J. Schwalb.

Contents
Exemplars of Evil is an accessory that shows how to build memorable villains for Dungeons & Dragons and presents eight ready-to-play villainous groups of various levels. Each villain comes with complete game statistics, as well as adventure seeds, campaign hooks, statistics for minions, and a fully described lair.

Publication history
Exemplars of Evil was written by Robert J. Schwalb, and published in September 2007.

Cover art was by Ron Spears, with interior art by Jason Chan, Eric Deschamps, Randy Gallegos, Tomás Giorello, Ron Hodgson, Ralph Horsley, Warren Mahy, Michael Phillippi, Eva Widermann, Kieran Yanner, and James Zhang.

The brief that Schwalb received for this project included a selection of nine archetypical villains, which he, Eytan Bernstein, Creighton Broadhurst, Steve Kenson, Kolja Raven Liquette, and Allen Rausch were assigned to develop into more interesting and compelling villains.

Reception

References

Dungeons & Dragons sourcebooks
Role-playing game supplements introduced in 2007